Juliana Luecking is an American musician, spoken-word artist and video maker.  is her YouTube channel where People Are a Trip, a series filmed in public places in New York City, is featured. Luecking's videos were instrumental in Picture New York's 2007 fight to protect the rights of NYC artists to shoot video and take pictures free of police harassment. Punk rocker Kathleen Hanna described Luecking as a mentor and instrumental to her development as a feminist. Luecking's name appears in the lyrics of the Le Tigre song "Hot Topic". In 1993, Luecking performed in Washington, DC for the March on Washington for Lesbian, Gay and Bi Equal Rights and Liberation.

References

Living people
Year of birth missing (living people)
American women musicians
American spoken word poets
American performance artists
21st-century American women